The 332d Airlift Flight is an inactive United States Air Force unit.  it was first organized in India in 1944 as the 11th Combat Cargo Squadron.  As the 332d Troop Carrier Squadron it remained in China through 1947.  The squadron was activated again for the Berlin Airlift from 1948 to 1949.

The squadron was active again from 1955 to 1958 as an assault airlift unit, operating the Fairchild C-123 Provider.  Its last period of active service was from 1993 to 2004 providing operational support airlift with C-21 Learjets.

History

World War II

The squadron was first activated in India in June 1944 as the 11th Combat Cargo Squadron, one of the original squadrons of the 3d Combat Cargo Group.  The squadron equipped with Douglas C-47 Skytrains and was attached to the 443d Troop Carrier Group shortly after the squadron was organized.  The squadron provided airlift support for the Allies in their efforts to control norther Burma, then in their drive southward.

In May 1945, the squadron moved its operations from India to China.  It was awarded the Distinguished Unit Citation following V-J Day for its actions in China, Mongolia and Vietnam in September 1945.  From October through December 1945, it airlifted Chinese troops to eastern China for the disarmament of Japanese troops locate there.

Beginning in January 1946, the squadron provided transportation for General George C. Marshall, who was attempting to resolve the civil war between the Nationalist and Communist forces seeking to control China.  These efforts proved unsuccessful and were terminated in early 1947 and the squadron was inactivated in April of that year.

Berlin Airlift

The squadron was activated a second time as the Air Force replaced its provisional 1422d Air Transport Group in November 1948 with the 513d Troop Carrier Group to operate its Douglas C-54 Skymasters flying from Rhein-Main Air Base, Germany to support the Berlin Airlift. The squadron flew food and supplies to West Berlin.  The Soviets ended their blockade of Berlin in May 1949, but airlift operations continued through September in order to create a stockpile should the Soviets resume the blockade. With the end of the airlift, air transport forces in Germany were drawn down and the squadron was inactivated in October of that year.

Assault airlift

The squadron was activated again at Sewart Air Force Base, Tennessee as an assault airlift unit.  Although initially equipped with Fairchild C-119 Flying Boxcars, it soon transitioned to the Fairchild C-123 Provider.  The squadron participated in numerous exercises to maintain proficiency in assault airlift operations.  In October 1957, Tactical Air Command converted its tactical units to the dual deputy organization and the squadron was reassigned from the 513th Group to the 513th Troop Carrier Wing.  The squadron was inactivated in 1958 as Sewart became a Lockheed C-130 Hercules base.

Operational support airlift
The squadron was redesignated the 322d Airlift Flight and activated with C-21 Learjets at Randolph Air Force Base, Texas in April 1993.  It was initially assigned to the 12th Operations Group at Randolph, but in 1997, operational support flights were transferred to Air Mobility Command (AMC) and the flight came under the 458th Airlift Squadron, located at Scott Air Force Base, Illinois.  The squadron provided airlift support, primarily to senior members of Air Education and Training Command.  Most of the flight's pilots were new pilots, who were also able to gain experience on an aircraft whose operating costs were lower than tactical airplanes.

The squadron's mission included aeromedical evacuation.  The use of the small C-21, rather than larger Douglas HC-9 Nightingales resulted in savings when missions called for transportation of single patients or small medical teams.  The flight kept a plane on alert on a rotating basis with its parent 458th Squadron. The squadron was inactivated in September 2004, when AMC consolidated the operations of its eight operational airlift flights into four squadrons.

Lineage
 Constituted as the 11th Combat Cargo Squadron on 1 June 1944
 Activated on 5 June 1944
 Redesignated 332d Troop Carrier Squadron on 29 September 1945
 Inactivated on 10 April 1947
 Redesignated 332d Troop Carrier Squadron, Special on 19 November 1948
 Activated on 19 November 1948
 Inactivated on 16 October 1949
 Redesignated 332d Troop Carrier Squadron, Assault, Fixed Wing on 30 June 1955
 Activated on 8 November 1955
 Redesignated 332d Troop Carrier Squadron, Assault on 1 July 1958
 Inactivated on 1 December 1958
 Redesignated 332d Airlift Flight on 1 April 1993
 Activated 15 April 1993
 Inactivated on 15 September 2004

Assignments
 3d Combat Cargo Group, 5 June 1944 (attached to 443d Troop Carrier Group, 16 June–12 August 1944)
 Fourteenth Air Force, c. 1 May 1945
 513th Troop Carrier Group, c. 1 November 1945
 Army Air Forces, China 15 April 1946 (under operational control of Peiping Headquarters Command)
 United States Army Forces, China, 20 June 1946 – 10 April 1947 (under operational control of Peiping Headquarters Command)
 513th Troop Carrier Group, 19 November 1948 – 16 October 1949
 513th Troop Carrier Group, 8 November 1955
 513th Troop Carrier Wing, 8 October 1957 – 1 December 1958
 12th Operations Group, 15 April 1993
 458th Airlift Squadron, 1 April 1997 – 15 September 2004

Stations
 Sylhet Airfield, India, 5 June 1944
 Dinjan Airfield, India, 6 June 1944 (detachment operated from Sookerating Airfield, India, 16 June–14 July 1944)
 Yunnani Airfield, China, 14 May 1945
 Luliang Airfield, China, 20 June 1945
 Shanghai Airport, China, 12 October 1945
 Peiping Airport, China, 20 April 1946 – 10 April 1947
 Rhein-Main Air Base, Germany, 19 November 1948 – 16 October 1949
 Sewart Air Force Base, Tennessee, 8 November 1955 – 1 December 1958
 Randolph Air Force Base, Texas, 15 April 1993 – 15 September 2004

Aircraft
 Douglas C-47 Skytrain, 1944–1947
 Curtiss C-46 Commando, 1945–1947
 Douglas C-54 Skymaster, 1948–1949
 Fairchild C-119 Flying Boxcar, 1955–1956
 Fairchild C-123 Provider, 1956–1958
 C-21 Learjet, 1993-2004

References

Notes
 Explanatory notes

 Citations

Bibliography

 
 
 
 
 
 

Flights of the United States Air Force
Airlift units and formations of the United States Air Force